Elizabeth Winnifred Wood  (October 8, 1903 – January 27, 1966), known as Elizabeth Wyn Wood, was a Canadian sculptor and advocate of art education. A notable figure in Canadian sculpture, she is primarily known for her modernist interpretation of the Canadian landscape in her works.

Early life and education 
Elizabeth Wyn Wood was born at her family's cottage on Cedar Island, just offshore from Orillia, Ontario, on October 8, 1903. She was the fourth child of Edward Alfred Wood (1860–1915) and Sarah Elizabeth Weafer (1864-1952). There was a ten-year gap between Wyn Wood and her next youngest sister Elmo. She had an older brother named Edward and another older sister named Fern.

Edward Wood Sr. was the proprietor of a dry-goods and women's clothing store in Orillia, Ontario. The same year that Elizabeth was born, the Woods moved into their home at 136 West Street in Orillia. The family also had two summer homes on Lake Couchiching. During the summer months, the family spent the majority of their time on the lake, and Wyn Wood learned how to swim and canoe at an early age.

Wood demonstrated an affinity for sculpture at a young age, using plasticine and clay to create art as a child. From the age of seven to 1917, Wood attended St. Mildred's College in Toronto, Ontario. She returned to Orillia every summer to spend time with her family, and in the wilderness surrounding their summer homes. Wood graduated from Ontario College of Art (OCA) in 1925. While at OCA, Wyn Wood studied under Group of Seven artists Arthur Lismer and J.E.H. MacDonald. She studied sculpture under Emanuel Hahn. In November 1926, Wyn Wood began a two-month placement at the Art Students League of New York, studying under Robert Laurent and Edward McCarton. While in New York she spent time studying Ancient Egyptian art and sculpture.

Notable works and affiliations 
Among her major public works are the Welland-Crowland War Memorial in Chippawa Park, Welland, Ontario, dedicated in 1939, and the 1962 bas-relief sculptures at Toronto Metropolitan University in Toronto.

The Welland-Crowland War Memorial 
The Welland Crowland War Memorial designed by Elizabeth Wyn Wood, features 2 heroic figures, Man the Defender and Woman the Giver, set against the Canadian landscape. Planned as part of a regional beautification plan for the lands along the Welland Canal, the memorial was intended to be visible and intelligible to passengers on passing boats. The Welland Crowland War Memorial was unveiled on 2 September 1939.

Professional affiliations and awards 
Together with Alfred Laliberté, Frances Loring, Florence Wyle and Henri Hébert, Wyn Wood was a founding member of the Sculptors' Society of Canada. In 1945, she was a founding member of the Canadian Arts Council (renamed the Canadian Conference of the Arts in 1958). As a Council member, she served as Organizing Secretary (1944–45), Chair of the International Relations Committee (1945–48), and Vice President (1945–48). As chair of the Foreign Relations Committee, she participated in the organization of, and wrote the catalogue foreword for, an exhibition of 74 artists entitled Canadian Women Artists at the Riverside Museum, New York, N.Y. (April 27 – May 18, 1947).

She was made a member of the Royal Canadian Academy of Arts (1948) and a member of the Ontario Society of Artists (1929). She was inducted into the Orillia Hall of Fame in 1966.

She taught at Central Technical School, Toronto, for some years.

References

External links

1903 births
1966 deaths
Canadian architectural sculptors
Canadian women sculptors
Art Students League of New York alumni
People from Orillia
Members of the Royal Canadian Academy of Arts
20th-century Canadian sculptors
20th-century Canadian women artists
Artists from Ontario